ASIL Lysi is a Cypriot football club which was established in the town of Lysi, Famagusta.
After the Turkish invasion of Cyprus in 1974, ASIL became a refugee team and is temporarily based in Larnaca. The club plays in the Cypriot Third Division.

History
The club was founded in Lysi, Famagusta on June 26, 1932.
Club founders were Ch. Fokaides, Ch. Panayides, K. Rousi and N. Petrou.
The choice for the club's name is attributed to Demetris Lambrou.

The club had its own stadium in Lysi. The stadium was called «Grigoris Afxentiou Stadium» as a memory of EOKA hero Grigoris Afxentiou who was born in Lysi and he was a player of ASIL. ASIL stadium was one of the first stadiums in Cyprus with grass. After the 1974 Turkish invasion, ASIL used Tsirion Stadium in Limassol as its ground and since 1978 the club is based in Larnaca. Since 1984 ASIL has a new stadium in Larnaca called «Grigoris Afxentiou Stadium». In 2019-20 season ASIL used AEK Arena as its ground and since 2020-21 season ASIL uses GSZ Stadium.

The best season for the club was 1968–69 in which they finished 6th in the first division.

Colours and badge
The club colours are yellow and black.
The emblem of the club is the discus thrower to symbolise
the club's commitment to the olympic ideals and true sportsmanship.

Players

Technical staff

League history
The following table shows the progress of the team in time (for those seasons found data).

Honours 
 Cypriot Second Division
Champions (2): 1967, 1974
 Cypriot Third Division
Champions (1): 2001

References

External links 

  ASIL FC Official Website

 
Football clubs in Cyprus
Association football clubs established in 1932
1932 establishments in Cyprus